Kenneth Gibson may refer to:

 Kenneth Gibson (cricketer) (1888–1967), English cricketer, played for Essex
 Kenneth Gibson (Scottish politician) (born 1961), Scottish National Party politician
 Kenneth James Gibson (born 1973), experimental, electronic, and dance music artist
 Kenneth A. Gibson (1932–2019), American politician
 Ken Gibson (loyalist), Ulster loyalist paramilitary and politician
 Ken Gibson (producer), Canadian television producer